"Life's Little Ups and Downs"' is a song originally recorded by Charlie Rich. Written by his wife, Margaret Ann Rich, the song appears on his second Epic album, 1969's The Fabulous Charlie Rich. His rendition spent eleven weeks on the country music charts in 1969, peaking at #41.

Critical reception
Rolling Stone magazine praised the song in its own review upon its release, calling it "as good as anything he's ever done" and predicting that the song "could make it on all the charts at once: R&B, Pop, Easy Listening and Country".

Chart performance

Ricky Van Shelton version

In 1990, Ricky Van Shelton covered the song on his third studio album, RVS III. Shelton's version of the song was released in October 1990 as the final single from that album. It spent twenty weeks on the country music charts and peaked at #4.

Chart performance

Year-end charts

References

1969 singles
1990 singles
Charlie Rich songs
Ricky Van Shelton songs
Song recordings produced by Billy Sherrill
Song recordings produced by Steve Buckingham (record producer)
Epic Records singles
Columbia Records singles
1969 songs